Atharsus nigricauda is a species of beetle in the family Cerambycidae, the only species in the genus Atharsus.

References

Elaphidiini